The 2017 Yushan World Open was a professional ranking snooker tournament that took place between 18 and 24 September 2017 in Yushan, China. It was the fifth ranking event of the 2017/2018 season.

Qualifying took place between 6–9 August in Preston.

Ali Carter was the defending champion but he chose not to participate.

Ding Junhui won his 13th ranking title, defeating Kyren Wilson 10–3 in the final. It was Ding's first ranking event win since the 2016 Shanghai Masters, a year earlier.

Prize fund
The breakdown of prize money for this year is shown below:

 Winner: £150,000
 Runner-up: £75,000
 Semi-final: £32,000
 Quarter-final: £18,000
 Last 16: £12,000
 Last 32: £7,000
 Last 64: £4,000

 Highest break: £3,000
 Total: £700,000

The "rolling 147 prize" for a maximum break stood at £30,000.

Main draw

Final

Qualifying
These matches were held between 6 and 9 August 2017 at the Preston Guild Hall in Preston, England. All matches were best of 9 frames.

Notes

Century breaks

Qualifying stage centuries

Total: 22

 138  Thepchaiya Un-Nooh
 131  Robin Hull
 131  Jamie Jones
 129  Barry Hawkins
 126  Xiao Guodong
 120  Cao Yupeng
 116  James Wattana
 113  Peter Ebdon
 112  Jack Lisowski
 112  Robert Milkins
 110  Matthew Stevens

 109  Oliver Lines
 107  Tom Ford
 106  Luca Brecel
 105  Stuart Bingham
 104  Ryan Day
 102  Zhang Anda
 102  Chen Zhe
 101  Fang Xiongman
 100  Alfie Burden
 100  Marco Fu
 100  Noppon Saengkham

Televised stage centuries

Total: 48

 143, 127, 118, 102  Li Hang
 142, 142  Thepchaiya Un-Nooh
 142  Jimmy Robertson
 137  Anthony McGill
 136  Marco Fu
 135, 127, 127, 113, 104, 102  Kyren Wilson
 132, 130  David Gilbert
 132  Duane Jones
 129  Peter Ebdon
 129  Michael Holt
 128, 121, 110, 108  Ding Junhui
 126, 125  John Higgins
 126, 121, 108  Mark Williams
 123, 110  John Astley

 119, 101  Sunny Akani
 117, 105  Luca Brecel
 117  Robert Milkins
 117  Elliot Slessor
 114  Joe Perry
 114  Chris Wakelin
 112  Eden Sharav
 105, 103  Mark Allen
 105  Stuart Bingham
 105  Yu Delu
 105  Tian Pengfei
 103, 100  Neil Robertson
 103  Matthew Selt

References

2017
World Open
World Open (snooker)
Snooker competitions in China
World Open